Salibi al-Zahir (given name also spelled Sulaybi or Celebi) (died 1773) was the multazem (tax farmer) of Tiberias in the mid-18th century, during the Ottoman rule. He was appointed to the post by his father, Zahir al-Umar, the virtually autonomous ruler northern Palestine. He was Zahir's eldest son and generally known to be his most loyal son. However, he did join his brothers Uthman, Ahmad and Sa'id in a rebellion against their father, in which they were defeated.

Salibi led a contingent of Zahir's troops to support Ali Bey al-Kabir's bid to regain control of Egypt from Abu al-Dhahab. However, Salibi and Ali Bey's troops were decisively defeated and Salibi was killed in battle. Zahir was distressed by the death of his son and upon hearing the news, he collapsed to the ground and exclaimed "From this day I am undone". Salibi was succeeded by his brother Ahmad al-Zahir as multazem of Tiberias.

References

Bibliography

1773 deaths
18th-century people from the Ottoman Empire
Ottoman rulers of Galilee
People from Tiberias
People killed in action
Salibi
18th-century Arabs